Horn Island is a long, thin barrier island off the Gulf Coast of Mississippi, south of Ocean Springs. It is one of the Mississippi–Alabama barrier islands and part of the Gulf Islands National Seashore. Horn Island is several miles long, but less than a mile wide at its widest point.

Description

The island, in part, shelters and bounds the Mississippi Sound to its north, and has a long beach on the Gulf of Mexico on its south side. The island is undeveloped, except for a small ranger station mid-island. Part of the Gulf Islands National Seashore, it is a favorite boating destination for those living on the Mississippi Gulf Coast.

Horn Island has long stretches of sugar-white sand, dunes punctuated with sea oats, tall pines on small groves, saw palmettos on small groves, and a few inland lagoons. It is home to varied wildlife including alligators, ospreys, pelicans, anhingas, ibises, manatees, ducks, rabbits, raccoons, tern, herons, and other migratory birds. The Sound and the Gulf host innumerable species of sea life.

History
From 1943 to 1945, Horn Island was closed to all public access and activity for use as a biological weapons testing site by the U.S. Army.

From 1946–1965, Walter Inglis Anderson, an artist from Ocean Springs, Mississippi, often visited the island to draw and paint the landscapes and life on the island. Many of his works are on display at the Walter Anderson Museum in Ocean Springs.

In 1989 the island was used as a propagation site for the endangered red wolf as part of the red wolf recovery program. This population was removed in 1998 because of a likelihood of encounters with humans.

Nearby islands
Horn is one of a chain of Mississippi–Alabama barrier islands. Other islands in the chain include Petit Bois Island and Dauphin Island to the east, and Ship Island and Cat Island to the west. Of the group, Horn Island is the largest.

See also

Gruinard Island
Horn Island Testing Station
Plum Island

References

External links

Barrier islands of Mississippi
History of Mississippi
Landforms of Jackson County, Mississippi
Gulf Islands National Seashore
Beaches of Mississippi